To-kawko, also spelled Tokawko, is a village in Kawkareik Township, in Kayin State, Myanmar (Burma). The headquarters of the KNU/KNLA Peace Council are located in the village.

References

Populated places in Kayin State